J. P. McCaskey may refer to:

John Piersol McCaskey, educator and mayor of Lancaster, Pennsylvania, from 1906 to 1910
J. P. McCaskey High School, high school in Lancaster, Pennsylvania